Parliamentary sovereignty is an ancient concept central to the functioning of the constitution of the United Kingdom but which is also not fully defined and has long been debated. Since the subordination of the monarchy under parliament, and the increasingly democratic methods of parliamentary government, there have been the questions of whether parliament holds a supreme ability to legislate and whether or not it should.

Parliamentary sovereignty is a description of the extent to which the Parliament of the United Kingdom has absolute and unlimited power. It is framed in terms of the extent of authority that parliament holds, and whether there are any sorts of law that it cannot pass. In other countries, a written constitution often binds the parliament to act in a certain way, but there is no codified constitution in the United Kingdom. In the United Kingdom, parliament is central to the institutions of state. The concept is exclusive to the UK Parliament and therefore does not extend to the Scottish Parliament, the Senedd and the Northern Ireland Assembly.

The traditional view put forward by A. V. Dicey is that parliament had the power to make any law except any law that bound its successors. Formally speaking however, the present state that is the UK is descended from the international Treaty of Union between England and Scotland in 1706/7 which led to the creation of the “Kingdom of Great Britain”. It is clear that the terms of that Treaty stated that certain of its provisions could not be altered, for example the separate existence of the Scottish legal system, and formally, these restrictions are a continuing limitation on the sovereignty of the UK Parliament. This has also been reconsidered by constitutional theorists including Sir William Wade and Trevor Allan in light of the European Communities Act 1972 and other provisions relating to membership of the European Union, and the position of the Human Rights Act 1998 and any attempts to make this or other legislation entrenched. These issues remain contested, although the United Kingdom has since ceased membership of the European Union and is no longer subject to its treaties.

The terms "parliamentary sovereignty" and "parliamentary supremacy" are often used interchangeably. The term "sovereignty" implies a similarity to the question of national sovereignty. While writer John Austin and others have looked to combine parliamentary and national sovereignty, this view is not universally held. Whichever term is used, it relates to the existence or non-existence of limits on parliament's power in its legislative role. Although the House of Commons' dominance within the Houses of Parliament is well attested, "parliamentary sovereignty" refers to their joint power. Almost all legislation is passed with the support of the House of Lords.

History
The Statute of Proclamations of 1539 gave the king wide powers to legislate without reference to, or approval from, Parliament. At the same time, it recognised the common law, existing statutory provisions, and excluded the breach of royal proclamations from the death penalty. It was repealed in 1547, but Queen Mary and Queen Elizabeth both relied on royal proclamations. A review by Chief Justice Edward Coke in 1610, the Case of Proclamations, established that Parliament had the sole right to legislate, but the Crown could enforce it. The concept of parliamentary sovereignty was central to the English Civil War: Royalists argued that power was held by the king, and delegated to Parliament, a view which was challenged by the Parliamentarians. The issue of taxation was a significant power struggle between Parliament and the king during the Stuart period. If Parliament had the ability to withhold funds from the monarch, then it could prevail. Direct taxation had been a matter for Parliament from the reign of Edward I, but indirect taxation continued to be a matter for the king.

Royal powers were finally removed by the Bill of Rights 1689. The Bill of Rights also removed the ability of the Crown to dispense with (ignore or suspend) legislation and statutes. Such a right had culminated in  James II's Declaration of Indulgence of 1687, which had ushered in the Glorious Revolution. That led the Earl of Shaftesbury to declare in 1689, "The Parliament of England is that supreme and absolute power, which gives life and motion to the English government". The Act of Settlement of 1700 removed royal power over the judiciary and defined a vote of both houses as the sole method of removing a judge.

Core theory
It was the view of A. V. Dicey, writing in the early twentieth century, that Parliament had "the right to make or unmake any law whatever; and, further, that no person or body is recognised by the law of England as having a right to override or set aside the legislation of Parliament". He refers to "England" but his view held for the other nations of the United Kingdom, with slightly different details. This view however side-steps the issue of the limitations formally placed on Parliament when the United Kingdom was first established in 1706/7 and the English and Scottish Parliaments surrendered, or perhaps more correctly pooled, their sovereignty into the new state.

There are at least three suggested sources for this sovereignty. The first is sovereignty by Act of Parliament itself. One response, put forward by John Salmond was to reject this idea: he believed that "no statute can confer this power on Parliament for this would be to assume and act on the very power that is to be conferred". An alternative is to see sovereignty conferred by way of the repeated and unchallenged use of sovereignty through the promulgation of laws by Parliament. The second possible source are the courts, that in enforcing all Acts of Parliament without exception, they have conferred sovereignty upon Parliament. The third alternative is the complex relationship between all parts of government, and their historical development. This is then assumed to be continuous and the basis for the future. However, if sovereignty was built up over time, "freezing" it at the current time seems to run contrary to that.

A group of individuals cannot hold sovereignty, only the institution of Parliament; determining what does and does not constitute an Act of Parliament is important. This is considered a "manner and form" requirement. In the absence of a written constitution, it is a matter for the common law to make this determination. The court does not consider any procedural defects of the bill if they are present; this is called the "enrolled Act" doctrine. For example, the case of Pickin v British Railways Board was dismissed because it relied on the standing order process not having been fulfilled.

However, the status of the Regency Acts is not so clear. In them, a regent acting during the infancy, incapacitation or absence of the monarch can assent to bills but cannot do so if they relate to changing the nature of monarchical inheritance or amending the Protestant Religion and Presbyterian Church Act 1707, which protected that church in Scotland. If a regent did assent to a bill of these kinds, it may not be held to be a valid law even if it gained the approval of both houses and royal assent.

Parliament may also make changes which impact successor parliaments as to their method of election and their constituent parts. For example, the Reform Act 1832 radically altered the distribution of MPs and subsequent parliaments followed the new rules. However, it remains open to any successor to legislate again to change these requirements, protecting its sovereignty. Similarly, only a reconstituted House of Lords could pass a bill reversing the changes of the House of Lords Act 1999 if its consent were required (unless the Parliament Acts were used). However, the whole system of government could be abolished, and the next parliament would not be bound if it were not considered a successor.

Application to Scotland
Some jurists have suggested that the Acts of Union 1707 place limits on parliamentary sovereignty and its application to Scotland. Although no Scottish court has yet openly questioned the validity of an Act of Parliament, certain judges have raised the possibility. Thus, in MacCormick v. Lord Advocate, the Lord President (Lord Cooper) stated that "the principle of the unlimited sovereignty of Parliament is a distinctively English principle which has no counterpart in Scottish Constitutional Law", and that legislation contrary to the Act of Union would not necessarily be regarded as constitutionally valid. Also, in Gibson v Lord Advocate, Lord Keith was circumspect about how Scottish courts would deal with an Act, which would substantially alter or negate the essential provisions of the 1707 Act, such as the abolition of the Court of Session or the Church of Scotland or the substitution of English law for Scots law.

The establishment of the Scottish Parliament in 1998 has implications for parliamentary supremacy. For example, although nuclear power is not within its competence, the Scottish government successfully blocked the wishes of the UK government to establish new nuclear power stations in Scotland using control over planning applications which is devolved. While it remains theoretically possible to dissolve the Scottish Parliament or legislate without its consent in relation to Scotland, in practice such a move would be politically difficult.

Development

Parliament Acts
The accepted rule is that the bill must be signed by both Houses of Parliament and be granted royal assent, unless the Parliament Act procedure has been properly enacted. The Parliament Acts create a system of passing a bill without the consent of the Lords. That system does not however, extend to private or local bills, nor bills extending the length of a parliament beyond five years. However, despite the granting of the Speaker's Certificate, certifying the act to be valid, the validity of an act passed under the Parliament Acts may still be challenged in the courts. In Jackson v Attorney General, the judges decided by a seven-to-two majority that an Act that extended the life of a parliament would be considered invalid by the courts if it had been passed under the Parliament Act procedure.

European Union (EU)
From 1 January 1973 to 31 January 2020, the United Kingdom was a member state of the European Union and its predecessor the three European Communities which was made up principally of the European Economic Community (EEC) which was widely known at the time as the “Common Market”, the European Coal and Steel Community (ECSC) which became defunct in 2002 and the European Atomic Energy Community (EAEC or Euratom) which the UK also withdrew from in 2020.

The European Communities Act 1972 gave European Union law (previously Community law) the force of law in the United Kingdom and it also incorporated the obligations of the European Treaties into UK domestic law as well.: section 2(1) reads: 2. General implementation of Treaties

(1) All such rights, powers, liabilities, obligations and restrictions from time to time created or arising by or under the Treaties, and all such remedies and procedures from time to time provided for by or under the Treaties, as in accordance with the Treaties are without further enactment to be given legal effect or used in the United Kingdom shall be recognised and available in law, and be enforced, allowed and followed accordingly ; and the expression " enforceable Community right" and similar expressions shall be read as referring to one to which this subsection applies. 

The case of R v. Secretary of State for Transport ex parte Factortame is considered decisive as to the superiority of EU law over British law. It judged that the Merchant Shipping Act 1988 and section 21 of the Crown Proceedings Act 1947 (which prevented an injunction against the Crown) should be disapplied. Alongside R v Employment Secretary, ex parte EOC, these two cases establish that any national legislation, coming into force before or after the European Communities Act 1972, cannot be applied by British courts if it contradicts Community law.

The Factortame case was considered to be revolutionary by Sir William Wade, who cited in particular Lord Bridge's statement that "there is nothing in any way novel in according supremacy to rules of Community law in areas to which they apply and to insist that... national courts must not be prohibited by rules of national law from granting interim relief in appropriate cases is no more than a logical recognition of that supremacy", which Wade characterises a clear statement that parliament can bind its successors and is therefore a very significant break from traditional thinking. Trevor Allan, argued, however, that the change in rule was accepted by the existing order because of strong legal reasons. Since legal reasons existed, the House of Lords had, instead, determined what the current system suggested under new circumstances and so no revolution had occurred.

Section 18 of the European Union Act 2011 declared that EU law is directly applicable only through the European Communities Act or another act fulfilling the same role. 18. Status of EU law dependent on continuing statutory basis

Directly applicable or directly effective EU law (that is, the rights, powers, liabilities, obligations, restrictions, remedies and procedures referred to in section 2(1) of the European Communities Act 1972) falls to be recognised and available in law in the United Kingdom only by virtue of that Act or where it is required to be recognised and available in law by virtue of any other Act.

Parliament legislated in 2018 to repeal the 1972 Act, and in 2020 the United Kingdom ceased to be a member of the EU in accordance with and by virtue of that Act (albeit amended by further legislation of Parliament), demonstrating that the previous Parliament (of 1972) had not bound its successor with respect to leaving the EU.

The European Union (Withdrawal Agreement) Act 2020 further declared that "It is recognised that the Parliament of the United Kingdom is sovereign."

Human Rights Act
The Human Rights Act 1998 confirmed the UK's commitment to the European Convention on Human Rights. In a white paper, the government expressed that "to make provision in the Bill for the courts to set aside Acts of Parliament would confer on the judiciary a general power over the decisions of Parliament which under our present constitutional arrangements they do not possess, and would be likely on occasions to draw the judiciary into serious conflict with Parliament". According to the theory that a parliament cannot bind its successors, any form of a Bill of Rights cannot be entrenched, and a subsequent parliament could repeal the act. In the government's words, "[It is our tradition] to allow any Act of Parliament to be amended or repealed by a subsequent Act of Parliament." However, it would have been possible to apply human rights rules to previous (rather than future) legislation. The government also confirmed that it had no plans to devise a special [entrenchment] arrangement for the bill.

Instead, it would be for courts to interpret legislation consistently with the Convention, if such an interpretation were possible. This system confirmed the formal authority of Parliament, while allowing judicial oversight. A court cannot strike down primary legislation.

Jackson v Attorney General
In Jackson v Attorney General, the appellants questioned the validity of the Parliament Act 1949. There were various arguments put forward by the appellants who were represented by Sir Sydney Kentridge QC. All nine judges accepted that the court had jurisdiction to consider whether the 1949 Act was valid. They looked to distinguish the case from that of Pickin v British Railways Board, where the unequivocal belief of the judges had been that "the courts in this country have no power to declare enacted law to be invalid". The judges believed that whereas Pickin had challenged the inner workings of Parliament, which a court could not do, Jackson questioned the interpretation of a statute.

R. v. Chaytor
The UK Supreme Court on December 1, 2010, in the Chaytor judgment, gave her first ruling on the parliamentary system. Approaching the procedural privilege of exclusivity and absolute pre-eminence of the chamber as a judge of its internal affairs (exclusive cognisance), the judges dated back to 1812 to refute the belief that the judge cannot examine in court fact happened within the House walls and to refute the belief that the contempt of Parliament is always and in any case the only way to face issues raised by the conduct of third parties not belonging to the Houses.

See also
 Separation of powers in the United Kingdom
 Rule of law in the United Kingdom

References

Citations

Bibliography

 Andrew Blick, Magna Carta and contemporary constitutional change, History and Policy (2015)
 

Parliament of the United Kingdom
Political science terminology
Politics of the United Kingdom
Constitution of the United Kingdom
Sovereignty